The 60th Assembly District of Wisconsin is one of 99 districts in the Wisconsin State Assembly.  Located in Eastern Wisconsin, the district covers northern Ozaukee County and parts of eastern Washington County.  It includes the city of Port Washington and the western half of the city of Cedarburg, as well as the villages of Belgium, Newburg, and Saukville.  It also contains the Harrington Beach State Park and Cedarburg Bog. The district is represented by Republican Robert Brooks, since January 2015.\

The 60th Assembly district is located within Wisconsin's 20th Senate district, along with the 58th and 59th Assembly districts.

List of past representatives

References 

Wisconsin State Assembly districts
Washington County, Wisconsin
Ozaukee County, Wisconsin